WMIS may refer to:

 WMIS (AM), a radio station (1240 AM) licensed to Natchez, Mississippi, United States
 WMIS-FM, a radio station (92.1 FM) licensed to Blackduck, Minnesota, United States
 World Molecular Imaging Society